Disco Gardens is the second album by the American R&B group Shalamar, released in 1978 on SOLAR Records. The group included Gerald Brown, Jeffrey Daniel and Jody Watley; it was the only Shalamar album on which Brown appeared.

Disco Gardens was less successful than Shalamar's debut, Uptown Festival, peaking at No. 171 on the Billboard 200. It also peaked at No. 52 on the R&B chart. "Take That to the Bank" was a UK Top 20 hit.

Track listing

Singles 

"Take That to the Bank" (US Hot 100 #79, US R&B #11, UK #20)

References

Shalamar albums
1978 albums
SOLAR Records albums
Albums produced by Leon Sylvers III